Craig Eric Sheffer (born April 23, 1960) is an American film and television actor. He is known for his leading roles as Norman Maclean in the film A River Runs Through It, Aaron Boone in the film Nightbreed, Joe Kane in the film The Program, and Keith Scott on the television series One Tree Hill.

Early and personal life
Sheffer was born in York, Pennsylvania. His father worked as a prison guard. Before becoming an actor, Sheffer sold newspapers in New York City and "slept under the marble staircase" in Grand Central Terminal for weeks while living off Unification Church spaghetti dinners."

Career
Sheffer was first seen on a nationwide basis as Ian Hayden on the ABC daytime soap opera One Life to Live, and on the 1983 prime time seriesThe Hamptons. His earliest starring assignment in films was as the best friend of troubled teenager Emilio Estevez in That Was Then... This Is Now (1985), a reformatory camp inmate in Fire with Fire (1986), an antagonistic rich kid in Some Kind of Wonderful (1987), and the romantic love interest of an overweight cosmetician in Baby Cakes     (1989).

Sheffer played the lead role of Aaron Boone/Cabal in Nightbreed (1990), author Norman Maclean in A River Runs Through It in (1992), and played Heisman Trophy candidate quarterback Joe Kane in The Program in 1993.

Sheffer's other films include Fire in the Sky (1993), Head Above Water (1996), and Sleep With Me (1994) (top-billed, as the apex of a romantic triangle which included Eric Stoltz and Meg Tilly). Sheffer played the leading role in Clive Barker's franchise sequel, Hellraiser: Inferno. He also played the main character in 1997's Bliss which starred Sheryl Lee, Terence Stamp and Leigh Taylor-Young.

Sheffer played Constant Bradley in the 1996 miniseries A Season in Purgatory.  He played Keith Scott on the CW Network series One Tree Hill for three seasons before his character was killed off halfway through season 3 (he also had several guest appearances in season 4). He directed the feature film American Crude, a dark comedy starring Ron Livingston and Rob Schneider; it was released straight to DVD in June 2008. Sheffer had a cameo appearance in the movie Stand Up Guys.

In 2016, Sheffer starred alongside Steven Seagal in Code of Honor.

Filmography

Film

Television

References

External links
 
  
 
 

1960 births
American male film actors
American male soap opera actors
American male television actors
Living people
People from York, Pennsylvania
Male actors from Pennsylvania